The Royal Cambodian Army is a part of the Royal Cambodian Armed Forces.  It has ground forces which numbered 85,000 divided into eleven divisions of infantry, with integrated armour and artillery support. The Royal Army is under the jurisdiction of the Ministry of National Defence.

Military organisation

Under the current military plan and divisions, every military region has a full division size.  Each division will be supplemented by a mobile reinforcement division in Phnom Penh.  The country is divided into six, until recently five, military regions, each comprising three or four provinces.  There are garrisons in major cities and major army bases.

General Hun Manet is the commander of the Royal Cambodian Army.  He is also the Deputy Commander in Chief of the Royal Cambodian Armed Forces.

The forces are deployed as required across the country and in operations, with bases as follows:
 Region One: Headquarters are in Stung Treng and the region covers the provinces of Stung Treng, Kratié, Ratanakiri and Mondulkiri.
 Region Two: Headquarters are in Kampong Cham and the region covers the provinces of Kampong Cham, Prey Veng, and Svay Rieng.
 Region Three: Headquarters are in Kampong Speu and the region covers the provinces of Kampong Speu, Takéo, Kampot, Sihanoukville, Koh Kong and Kep.
 Region Four: Headquarters are in Siem Reap and the region covers the provinces of Siem Reap, Oddar Meanchey, Preah Vihear, and Kampong Thom.
 Region Five: Headquarters are in Battambang and the region covers the provinces of Battambang, Pursat, Banteay Meanchey and Pailin.
 Special Region: Headquarters are in the capital, Phnom Penh and the region covers the provinces of Kampong Chhnang, Kandal and the greater municipality of Phnom Penh.

Every Military Region is under the command of a Major General, assisted by a Chief of staff with a rank of a Brigadier General. In every province, there is a military base called Military Operation Zone under the command of a Colonel.

Airborne special forces

Equipment

Peacekeeping operations
The RCAF has sent RCAF personnel to various hotspots as part of the Kingdom of Cambodia's role as a member of the United Nations. Mostly engineers and logistical units, a total of 6,822 soldiers, of them 369 are women, have been so far sent to 10 peacekeeping missions in nine countries such as:

Army ranks and insignia

See also
 Cambodian Civil War
 Khmer National Army
 Khmer National Armed Forces
 Royal Cambodian Armed Forces
 Royal Cambodian Air Force
 Royal Cambodian Navy
 Weapons of the Cambodian Civil War

References

 http://www.manager.co.th/IndoChina/ViewNews.aspx?NewsID=9520000121559

External links

 
 Ministry of National Defence
 PhnomPenhPost

Military of Cambodia
Cambodia
Military units and formations established in 1953